East of Havana is a 2006 documentary film co-produced by South African actress Charlize Theron. The film features three young Cuban rappers: Soandry, Magyori, and Mikki and centers on their experiences in the Cuban underground hip hop scene.

Charlize Theron attended SXSW Film Festival to introduce her productions new movie titled “East of Havana". The movie chronicles the journey of three underground hip hop artists in Cuba.

References

External links

East of Havana on Rotten Tomatoes
East of Havana on Metacritic

2006 films
Cuban hip hop
Films produced by Charlize Theron
2000s English-language films